Kahenge was a constituency in the Kavango Region of Namibia. The district centre was the settlement of Kahenge. It had a population of 29,799 in 2011, down from 30,903 in 2001.

The constituency contained the Okavango River settlements of Tondoro, Rupara, and Sambusu as well as the inland settlements of Mpanda and Mpuku.

In 2013 the Kavango Region was split into Kavango East and Kavango West. Kahenge Constituency was split into three constituencies. The western part became Tondoro (capital Kahenge), the north-eastern part became Musese (capital Rupara), and the south-eastern part formed the constituency Mankumpi (capital Satotwa).

References 

Kavango West
States and territories established in 1992
States and territories disestablished in 2013